The following is a list of notable footballers who have played for Blackpool Football Club. Generally, this refers to players who have played 100 or more Football League matches for the club. Those listed who do not meet this criterion are considered to have made significant contributions to the club's history.

List

Players are listed alphabetically, but each column is sortable. Appearances and goals apply to league matches only; wartime matches are excluded. Substitute appearances included. Names in bold denote current players.

Notes

GK = Goalkeeper
DF = Defender
MF = Midfielder
FW = Forward
  Represented his country as a Blackpool player
  Blackpool's record sale
  Spent entire professional career at Blackpool
  Only includes pre-War statistics
  Blackpool's record signing

References
Specific

General
 
 
 Soccerbase

b
Blackpool F.C.
Association football player non-biographical articles